John Thoresby may refer to:

 John of Thoresby, English clergyman and politician
 John Thoresby (burgess), member of parliament for Great Grimsby